Patrick Vetterli (born 6 October 1961) is a Swiss athlete. He competed in the men's decathlon at the 1984 Summer Olympics.

References

1961 births
Living people
Athletes (track and field) at the 1984 Summer Olympics
Swiss decathletes
Olympic athletes of Switzerland
Place of birth missing (living people)